Mary Ann Martin, Lady Martin ( Parker; 5 July 1817 – 2 January 1884) was an English community leader, teacher and writer in New Zealand. 

Mary Ann Parker was born in London in 1817. Her father William Parker, a Church of England clergyman, was rector of St Ethelburga's Bishopsgate. On 3 April 1841 at St Ethelburga's, she married William Martin who had been appointed the first chief justice of New Zealand and she soon followed him to New Zealand.

In 1874 they left NZ for Lichfield in England, where Selwyn was bishop. After Selwyn's death in April 1878 they moved to Torquay, Devon. There Mary Martin was involved in the church and in the work of the recently founded Girls' Friendly Society. After her husband's death in 1880 she remained in Torquay until her death on 2 January 1884.

Her book, Our Maoris, was published posthumously in 1884 by the Society for Promoting Christian Knowledge.

References

1817 births
1884 deaths
New Zealand educators
New Zealand writers
New Zealand women writers
English emigrants to New Zealand
19th-century New Zealand people
19th-century women writers
Wives of knights